Wali Khan Railway Station (Balochi: والی خان ریلوے اسٹیشن ) is  located in Pakistan.

See also
 List of railway stations in Pakistan
 Pakistan Railways

References

External links

Railway stations in Balochistan, Pakistan
Railway stations on Quetta–Taftan Railway Line